The Grove School is a Montessori-based public charter school located in Redlands, California, United States.  The school serves grades 7–12 on two campuses.  Based on Montessori theory and practice, the Grove School accepts children from families in the Redlands School District, and those in surrounding communities.

School structure and campuses
The Grove School was founded in 1999. The high school (grades ten to twelve) sits on the campus of Montessori in Redlands. The Farm or middle school campus (grades 7–9) was founded in 2003 and is a working farm, run by students.  The classrooms are housed in the old farmhouse and associated outbuildings.

The land, part of the Heritage Park Historical District in Redlands, includes facilities for small livestock and basic agricultural crops.

The Farm campus includes historic Barton School House. Built in 1901, it is one of the oldest buildings in Redlands.

It was moved from its original location, Alabama Street, to Heritage Park on the Farm School campus.  

Ninth grade farm students are slowly incorporated into the high school community over the course of the year.

Academics
The Grove School follows the Montessori philosophy that students learn best by "doing."

The Grove is a California Distinguished School.

Clubs
 ASB/Student Council
 4-H
 FFA
 STAR (Support The Artistic Ravens)
 SOAR (Support Our Athletic Ravens)
 Speech and Debate
 National Honor Society
 Environmental Club
 Chivalry
 Music Club
 Metal Club
 International Thespian Society
 Art Club
 Math Club
 Global Awareness Club/ Model United Nations
 Mental Health Awareness Club
 Young America's Foundation
 Rotary Interact Service Club
 Pride Club
 International Thespians Society
 National Honors Society
 Choir
 Music Ensemble
 Mock trial speech and debate

Athletics
The Grove School offers multiple sports to both middle school and high school students. Grove is a member of CIF-SS and competes in multiple leagues.

Leagues
 Majestic League 
 Inland Coast League (Boys Volleyball)
 Victory League (Varsity Soccer)
 Mountain Valley League (Middle School)

High School teams (9-12)
 Baseball
 Basketball (Boys)
 Cross Country (Boys)
 Cross Country (Girls)
 Soccer (Boys/Co-ed)
 Softball
 Volleyball (Girls)
 Volleyball (Boys)

Middle School teams (7-8)
 Volleyball (Girls)
 Soccer (Co-ed)
 Cross Country (Boys)
 Cross Country (Girls)
 Basketball (Boys)

References

External links
 
 

High schools in San Bernardino County, California
Redlands Unified School District
Charter preparatory schools in California
Buildings and structures in Redlands, California
1999 establishments in California